The Good Bad-Man is a 1916 American silent Western film directed by Allan Dwan. The film was written by Douglas Fairbanks, and produced by Fairbanks and the Fine Arts Film Company. It stars Fairbanks and Bessie Love.

The film was originally distributed by Triangle Film Corporation. The film was edited and re-released by Tri-Stone Pictures in 1923.

Plot

"Passin' Through" (Fairbanks) is a benevolent outlaw who holds up trains so that he can provide for fatherless children in the Old West. He knows little of his personal history, but he is pursued by a US marshal (Cannon) who does. Along the way, he encounters Amy (Love), and falls in love with her. A rival bandit, "The Wolf" (De Grasse), is also a rival for Amy, but Passin' and Amy eventually marry.

Cast

Preservation status

No print of the original 1916 release exists, but a print of the 1923 re-release is preserved at the Library of Congress.

On May 31, 2014, a restored print of the 1923 version was shown at the San Francisco Silent Film Festival at the Castro Theatre. This print has an original title at the beginning: "Supervised by D. W. Griffith".

Release and reception
At the film's Los Angeles premiere, Bessie Love sang "The Rosary" by Ethelbert Woodbridge Nevin.

The film received positive reviews. The cast and director, in particular, were noted for their excellent work in contemporaneous reviews.

Legacy
Fairbanks biographer Jeffrey Vance finds The Good Bad-Man fascinating for what it reveals about Fairbanks the man. Vance writes:

Notes

References

Bibliography

Further reading
 Vance, Jeffrey. Douglas Fairbanks. Berkeley, CA: University of California Press, 2008. .

External links

 
 
 

1916 Western (genre) films
1916 films
American black-and-white films
Films directed by Allan Dwan
Surviving American silent films
Triangle Film Corporation films
Silent American Western (genre) films
1910s American films
1910s English-language films